This table displays the top-rated primetime television series of the 1974–75 season as measured by Nielsen Media Research.

References

1974 in American television
1975 in American television
1974-related lists
1975-related lists
Lists of American television series